was a Japanese football player. He played for Japan national team.

Club career
Tsuda was born in Kobe on August 15, 1917. He played for Keio BRB was consisted of his alma mater Keio University players and graduates. He won 1936, 1937, 1939 and 1940 Emperor's Cup at Keio University and Keio BRB. 1940 Emperor's Cup was the last Emperor's Cup before the war because Emperor's Cup was suspended for World War II from 1941 to 1945.

After World War II, Tsuda won 1951 and 1952 Emperor's Cup as a member of Keio BRB and All Keio. He also played East Japan Heavy Industries.

National team career
On June 16, 1940, when Tsuda was a Keio University student, he debuted for Japan national team against Philippines and Japan won the match. This match was the first match since 1936 Summer Olympics and the only match in the 1940s in Japan's International A Match due to World War II.

After World War II, Japan national team was resumed activities in 1951 and Tsuda was selected Japan for 1951 Asian Games. He played 4 games for Japan until 1951.

On April 17, 1979, Tsuda died of a parkinson's disease at the age of 61.

National team statistics

Honours
Japan
Asian Games Bronze medal: 1951

References

External links
 
 Japan National Football Team Database

1917 births
1979 deaths
Keio University alumni
Association football people from Hyōgo Prefecture
Japanese footballers
Japan international footballers
Asian Games medalists in football
Footballers at the 1951 Asian Games
Medalists at the 1951 Asian Games
Association football goalkeepers
Asian Games bronze medalists for Japan
Neurological disease deaths in Japan
Deaths from Parkinson's disease